Yousef Ramadan (Arabic: يوسف رمضان) (born 16 July 1992) is a Qatari born-Egyptian footballer. He currently plays for Al-Markhiya as a right back.

External links
 

IG:youssefselim_25
 https://www.instagram.com/y.selim.28/

Qatari footballers
1992 births
Living people
Al-Gharafa SC players
Al-Khor SC players
Al-Arabi SC (Qatar) players
Al-Markhiya SC players
Naturalised citizens of Qatar
Qatari people of Egyptian descent
Qatar Stars League players
Qatari Second Division players
Association football defenders